Trichotoma is a genus of gylippid camel spiders, first described by Reginald Frederick Lawrence in 1968.

Species 
, the World Solifugae Catalog accepts the following three species:

 Trichotoma brunnea Lawrence, 1968 — Namibia
 Trichotoma fusca (Roewer, 1941) — Namibia
 Trichotoma michaelseni (Kraepelin, 1914) — Namibia

References 

Arachnid genera
Solifugae